The Herrera Period is a phase in the history of Colombia. It is part of the Andean preceramic and ceramic, time equivalent of the North American pre-Columbian formative and classic stages and age dated by various archaeologists. The Herrera Period predates the age of the Muisca, who inhabited the Altiplano Cundiboyacense before the Spanish conquest of the Muisca and postdates the prehistory of the region in Colombia. The Herrera Period is usually defined as ranging from 800 BCE to 800 CE, although some scholars date it as early as 1500 BCE.

Ample evidence of the Herrera Period has been uncovered on the Altiplano Cundiboyacense. The main archaeologists contributing to the present knowledge about the Herrera Period are the scholars Ana María Groot, Gonzalo Correal Urrego, Thomas van der Hammen, Carl Henrik Langebaek Rueda, Sylvia M. Broadbent, and Marianne Cardale de Schrimpff.

Etymology 
The Herrera Period is named after Lake Herrera (Laguna de la Herrera) where archaeologist Silvia Broadbent performed the first excavations on the Herrera Period in 1971. Lake Herrera is one of the many remnants of the ancient Lake Humboldt, a Pleistocene lake that existed on the Bogotá savanna. The site of Lake Herrera (Laguna de la Herrera) is close to the archaeological site of Aguazuque.

Background 
The region of the Herrea Period and later Muisca Confederation, the Altiplano Cundiboyacense; high plateau of the central Colombian Andes has been inhabited since 12,400 years BP. The earliest evidence for inhabitation (lithic tools) are found in El Abra and Tequendama. This lithic period is roughly defined as from 12,400 to 1000 BCE. Later sites are Aguazuque and Checua.

Agriculture started around 5000 years before present which led to the development of more complex societies, of which the Herrera Period is one of many in the Andean civilizations. Early evidence of inhabitation has been found in Zipacón and is dated at 3270 BCE. From the Herrera Period ceramic has been found. The oldest ceramic evidence found dates to 2500 BP (500 BCE), except for one piece found near Tocarema and dated at 2750 BP.

The people from the Herrera Period performed agriculture, as evidenced in among others the Thomas van der Hammen Reserve, named after Dutch geologist and botanist Thomas van der Hammen.

The Late Herrera Period coincides with the Nahuange Period (200-900) of the Tairona.

Archaeological sites 
Archaeological evidence of the Herrera Period has been found in numerous places on the Altiplano Cundiboyacense, among others in Sopó, Soacha, Usme, Iza, Gámeza, Facatativá (Piedras del Tunjo Archaeological Park), Moniquirá (El Infiernito), Chía, Chita, Chiscas, Soatá, Jericó, Sativasur, Covarachía, Sativanorte and El Cocuy.

The site in Soacha is one of the most important finds from the Herrera Period, dating from 400 BCE onwards, into the age of the Muisca. At the site the remains of 2200 individual people, 274 complete ceramic pots, stone tools, seeds of cotton, maize, beans and curuba, 634 fragmented and intact spindles and 100 tunjos not used for offerings have been found in Soacha.

Timeline

Classifications 
Over the years and based on new findings, various authors have defined periods of Herrera and Muisca. Regional variations also exist, listed below.

Regional variations

Western slopes of the Eastern Ranges

Boyacá

See also 
Muisca Confederation
Aguazuque, Lake Herrera, Tequendama

References

Bibliography

Further reading

External links 

2
Archaic period in the Americas